The American Tour de Sol (ATdS) was an annual electric vehicle conference and rally that ran from 1989 to 2006 under the supervision of the Northeast Sustainable Energy Association (NESEA), drawing inspiration from the Tour de Sol that started in Switzerland in 1985. One of the annual ATDS events was a multi-day road rally from Montpelier, Vermont to Boston which started in 1990. After gaining support from the United States Department of Energy, the ATdS began including alternative fuel vehicles.

History

References

External links
 
 
 
 

Electric vehicle industry